"Dark Horse" is a song by American singer Katy Perry featuring American rapper Juicy J. It was originally released on September 17, 2013, by Capitol Records as the first promotional single from Perry's fourth studio album, Prism (2013). Three months later, it was released as the third official single on December 17. Both artists co-wrote the song with its producers, Max Martin, Cirkut, and Dr. Luke, alongside Sarah Hudson. It was conceived by Perry and Hudson during a writing session in Perry's hometown of Santa Barbara, California, and Juicy J was later commissioned for a verse on the song.

"Dark Horse" combines the genres of trap, hip hop, pop-rap and electropop, replicating what has been described as a "Southern rap-techno mashup". The track features a minimal production, with a "seductive" and "mature" tone to Perry's vocals, while Juicy J is featured on the song's intro and rapped bridge. Perry, in interviews, said she wanted the song to have a "witchy, spell-y kind of black magic-y idea", so she wrote it from the perspective of a witch warning a man not to fall in love with her because if he does, she will be his last. The song was part of a competition sponsored by Pepsi in which fans could vote via Twitter on whether they would prefer either "Dark Horse" or "Walking on Air" to be released as the first promotional single from Prism.

"Dark Horse" was a commercial success, charting at number one in Canada, the Netherlands, Poland, and the United States. It also reached the top ten in almost 20 countries, including New Zealand, the United Kingdom, Sweden, and Venezuela, as well as on the Digital Songs chart of Billboard magazine. Billboard credits "Dark Horse" for helping cement trap music's place on the charts. Perry first performed the song live at the 2013 iHeartRadio Music Festival in Las Vegas on September 20, 2013. The song's first major television performance was at the 56th Annual Grammy Awards on January 26, 2014. "Dark Horse" was nominated for Best Pop Duo/Group Performance at the 57th Annual Grammy Awards. The song has sold 13.2 million units (combined sales and track-equivalent streams), becoming the second best-selling song worldwide for 2014.

In 2014, Flame, a Christian rap artist, filed a copyright infringement lawsuit against Perry and the other songwriters, claiming that "Dark Horse" copied from his 2008 song "Joyful Noise". On July 29, 2019, a federal jury ruled in favor of Flame and the co-plaintiffs Da' T.R.U.T.H. and  Chike Ojukwu. The jury ordered Perry, her collaborators, and associated labels to pay $2.78 million in damages; of which Perry was ordered to pay $550,000. However, in part due to a similar judgment that found Led Zeppelin's "Stairway to Heaven" clear of copyright infringement in the Ninth Circuit, the jury award was vacated on appeal in March 2020.

Production and release
Inspired by the 1996 film The Craft, Perry and singer-songwriter Sarah Hudson wrote the first version of "Dark Horse" in Perry's hometown of Santa Barbara, California. Perry described the song as a "juxtaposition", as it mixed her, a pop music artist, with an "urban kind of hip-hop-flavored background soundtrack"; and its lyrics as "witchy and dark", written from the perspective of "a witch warning [a] man to not fall in love with [her]", and if so, she would be his last. Perry then asked producer Dr. Luke to contact one of his Kemosabe Records artists, American rapper Juicy J, for a guest verse. Juicy J complimented Perry as having a "very professional" work ethic and being substantially involved in the song's development. He said: "My verse I did on that song, she was singing it. She's really a genius, she was by the mixing board and telling the guy what to take in and take out. She's really hands-on with her music, she knows music."

"Dark Horse" was recorded and engineered at Luke's in the Boo in Malibu, Conway Recording Studios in Hollywood, Playback Recording Studios in Santa Barbara, California, and Secret Garden Studios in Montecito, as well as MXM Studios in Stockholm, Sweden. It was engineered by Peter Carlsson, Mike "Crazy Mike" Foster, Clint Gibbs, Sam Holland, and Michael Ilbert. They were assisted by Eric Eylands, Rachael Findlen, Justin Fox, Elliot Lanam, and Cory Bice. It was mixed by Şerban Ghenea, while John Hanes served as the engineer for mix. All instrumentation and programming was done by Dr. Luke, Max Martin, and Cirkut.

In a press release on August 20, 2013, Pepsi announced a partnership with Perry to promote her fourth studio album Prism: a social "tweet-to-unlock" voting program, encouraging fans to tweet the hashtag #KATYNOW in exchange for song titles and lyrics. The chosen tracks for the campaign were "Walking on Air" and "Dark Horse". After the samples were revealed, fans could vote for which one they wanted to have an early release on digital retailers. The winner was "Dark Horse", which was released on September 17, 2013, on the iTunes Store. Due to its commercial success, it was sent to contemporary hit and rhythmic radio stations on December 17, 2013, as Prisms third official single.

Composition
"Dark Horse" is a trap, hip hop, pop rap and electropop song. which is styled in "Southern rap-techno mashup", and has a length of three minutes and thirty-five seconds. Musically, the verses are built around icy rhythms and chopped and screwed vocal samples, while the chorus' feature Perry singing into a gradual crescendo. The song contains a grimy, "incredibly simplistic" production. According to Kathy Iandoli of MSN Entertainment, "Dark Horse" contains a mixture of elements from "trippy pop", EDM, and dubstep. According to the sheet music published at Musicnotes.com, "Dark Horse" is written in the key of B minor.  It follows a chord progression of G – D – Bm – Bm/A, and the vocals range from the low note of B3 to the high note of D5. "Dark Horse" has a tempo of 132 beats per minute in half-time style typical of trap music.

A writer for the Winnipeg Free Press described the song as "brooding, borderline sleazy trap-pop excursion that comes across like a stripped-down version of "E.T." mixed with "Grindin'" by The Clipse," before going on to call it unexpected, unconventional, and unstoppable.

Critical reception

Marc Hogan from Spin called the lyrics a "cliché salad" but believed that the song had potential to become a hit due to its "soaring hooks" and "sleekly sculpted production". Reviewing the song for Billboard, Jason Lipshutz said that by exploring trap-influenced music, Perry "score[d]" and "slay[ed]". Digital Spy's Robert Copsey questioned the decision to not have a proper chorus in "Dark Horse" and the inclusion of Juicy J, though he praised the "sleazy" beat and "sultry" vocals from Katy Perry. He gave the track a rating of four stars out of five. Contributor Dylan Mial of Blogcritics said the "juxtaposition" of Perry's vocals and Juicy J's rap brought "the ingredients for a perfect musical storm" and favored Perry for the "uniqueness" of the single.

Keith Murphy from Vibe called the track "infectiously sexy", while John Walker from MTV was similarly positive about the song, though he wrote that Juicy's verse was "phoned-in". Sal Cinquemani of Slant Magazine likened the song to avant-garde band Art of Noise's song "Moments In Love" and called it a "continuation" of "E.T.", and further labelled it as a "standout" from Prism. While she did not give her opinion of the song as a whole, Helen Brown from the publication The Daily Telegraph criticized Juicy J for his "daft" rap. For AbsolutePunk, Craig Manning classified "Dark Horse" as Prisms worst song, while also panning the rapper's contribution. Marah Eakin from The A.V. Club was not entirely critical of the song, though she noted that it was not among "Perry's best".

Consequence of Sound's Chris Bosman had a mixed response—while he praised the song for feeling "vital" and "forward-moving", he criticized the guest vocals and nonetheless deemed the trap influence "trap for soccer moms". Writing for ABC News, Mesfin Fekadu commented that "her team fare[d] better" in the song and observed that the "Southern hip-hop and electronic flavors" present on it were factors that made it "work". Pop music website Idolator's Sam Lansky opined that the "weird trap-lite" of the song "never quite coalesces". The song was nominated for Best Song at the 2014 MTV Europe Music Awards, though lost to Ariana Grande's "Problem". It has been nominated for Best Pop Duo/Group Performance at the 57th Annual Grammy Awards.

Accolades

Chart performance

"Dark Horse" debuted at number seventeen on the Billboard Hot 100 and at number four on the Hot Digital Songs chart with 194,000 downloads sold for the week ending October 5, 2013. 
Following its release as a single,  after several weeks of ascending the chart, "Dark Horse" reached number one in the United States on the chart dated February 8, 2014. It marked Perry's ninth US number one and Juicy J's first, and remained atop the chart for four consecutive weeks. It spent 22 weeks in the top ten and 57 weeks on the chart in total, marking Perry's longest stay in both the top ten and on the Hot 100 itself. Besides its success on the Hot 100, "Dark Horse" also performed extremely well on Billboard's component charts, topping the Mainstream Top 40 chart for five weeks, giving Perry her record-tying eleventh number-one, the Hot Dance Club Songs chart, becoming her record-extending thirteenth consecutive number one, and the Rhythmic chart, becoming her second number one, while reaching numbers two and six on the Adult Pop Songs and the Adult Contemporary charts respectively. As of August 2020, the song has sold 6.4 million copies in the nation, and has been certified eleven-times platinum by the Recording Industry Association of America (RIAA).

In Canada, "Dark Horse" debuted at number eight on the Canadian Hot 100 chart, and peaked at number one for two weeks, becoming the Perry's tenth number-one single in the country and Juicy J's first, and has since been certified seven-times platinum by Music Canada for sales of 560,000 units. "Dark Horse" peaked at number two on the New Zealand Singles Chart becoming Perry's twelfth top ten, and was certified double platinum by the RMNZ.
In Australia, the song was not eligible to chart on the ARIA Top 100 Singles Chart but peaked at number five on the ARIA Top 50 Digital Tracks and was certified eight-times platinum by the ARIA, for sales of 560,000 units. "Dark Horse" also saw major success in Europe. In the UK, it peaked at number four on the UK Singles Chart, becoming her thirteenth top ten hit, while peaking at number three in both Ireland and Scotland. The song topped the charts in the Netherlands, Belgium (Flanders), and Poland, while reaching number two in Austria, Norway, and Sweden, number three in Belgium (Wallonia), number four in Israel, Switzerland, and the Czech Republic, number five in Italy, number six in Germany, France, and Denmark, number eight in Hungary, and number nine in Spain. It earned certifications in Sweden (four times platinum), Italy (three times platinum), Norway (three times platinum), the UK (two times platinum), Mexico (two times platinum), Germany (three times gold), and Belgium (gold). "Dark Horse" sold 13.2 million units worldwide in 2014, finishing as the second best-selling song of the year according to the International Federation of the Phonographic Industry (IFPI).

Music video

Background and release
In an interview with Billboard at the 2014 Grammy Awards, Juicy J stated the video will be filmed "soon"; he added that it is "a major motion picture." He further teased the release by saying, "I can't really tell you because it's definitely going to be a surprise, but I'll tell you this much right here: you've seen her other videos, this one's gonna be just as big. Everything she does is like grade A."

When "Dark Horse" had attained the top position on the US Billboard Hot 100 Chart, Perry announced that she was working on the video. " On February 6, 2014, Perry tweeted the video would be released "soon". On February 13, 2014, she released a preview of the music video onto her Vevo account on YouTube, revealing the Egyptian setting of the video. Perry played a character named "Katy Pätra", a takeoff on the Egyptian queen Cleopatra. The video was released on February 20, 2014.

The music video was directed by Mathew Cullen, who previously worked with Perry on her music video for the song "California Gurls". Perry's idea for the music video was to combine Ancient Egyptian culture with Memphis, Tennessee hip hop: setting the video in ancient Memphis, Egypt as a nod to Juicy J's Tennessee hometown. Speaking of Perry's concept, Cullen said "That's music to my ears — when an artist has a couple concepts that they want to mash up to create something fresh."

On June 9, 2015, the music video for "Dark Horse" became the first video by a female artist to reach 1 billion views on Vevo. Perry also became the first female to have a video on YouTube with 1 billion views. As of August 2022, the video has received over 3.3 billion views on YouTube, making it the 15th most viewed music video of all time and 2nd most viewed music video of all time by a female artist, just behind another Perry song, "Roar".

Synopsis

During the video's opening, it is revealed that the music video takes place "a crazy long time ago" in Memphis, Egypt. For the opening verses, Perry's character Katy Pätra, the witch of Memphis, is shown wearing a white dress and white and blue wig while floating on a large barge at sunset, with pyramids and palm trees visible in the background. The video transitions to a different scene where Pätra, now wearing a longer dress and a black wig, sits in an extravagant Sphinx-like throne while pharaohs gather to bring her expensive gifts (such as a large diamond) in an attempt to "win her heart".

After retrieving the first suitor's gift, she hits the man with a magical bolt of lightning from her hand, turning him into a pile of sand, and takes his jewels to wear on her teeth as a grill. Another suitor brings her candy, cupcakes, twinkies, and spicy cheese puffs. After she burns her mouth with the spicy cheese puffs, she turns the suitor into a large cup of water, which she drinks. Pätra also appears as a gray statue in a scene where golden pythons and gray guardian statues such as Anubis, Horus, Nisroch and Apep surround her, and in a scene with a blue background where she wears a golden dress and several golden hieroglyphs levitate around her.

During Juicy J's verse, the rapper emerges from a gold sarcophagus while Pätra accepts an Egyptian chariot with hydraulics (she turns the associated suitor into a set of giant dice to hang from the frame) and rejects a suitor who turns out to have the face of a crocodile by turning him into a wallet. During the final chorus, the last suitor brings Pätra a large gold pyramid with a pink capstone, which she ascends. At the top of the pyramid, Pätra, dressed as Isis, uses her powers to conjure up a magical "perfect storm" with pink, purple, and violet clouds. Although it seems like Pätra has finally found a gift she likes, the final frame of the video reveals that she has turned the final suitor into a dog with a human head.

Reception
The music video was criticized by some for appropriating the symbols and imagery of Egyptian culture. Cullen, the director, defended the music video, saying that, while he believes it is dangerous to rip things directly from present cultures without adding anything to them, Ancient Egypt is part of what he calls our "shared collective mythology". He said: "The most important thing is that when you create something, and this is actually something Katy and I worked to do — you bring a new spin to it." Egyptologist David P. Silverman praised the music video's use of Egyptian imagery and the interest it could generate to viewers: "[Egypt has] always been a part of popular culture. It encourages people to think of these things, and some of those people actually begin to learn a lot." The video was noted by conspiracy theorists for bearing resemblance to imagery used by the alleged Illuminati, but Robert K. Ritner rejected the allegations, saying that "The many discussions of the Illuminati are nonsense" and that, in fact, the masonic imagery associated with the Illuminati is drawn from Egyptian imagery (as a common source for both).

Accusations of blasphemy
The music video caused controversy among Muslims who criticized a scene in the video where a man wearing a pendant appearing to display the Arabic word for "Allah" is disintegrated and turned into sand by Perry's character. The scene took place 1 minute and 15 seconds into the video. A petition launched on Change.org accused Perry of "representing an opposition of God" and demanded that the video be taken down from YouTube. The petition reached over 65,000 signatures and as a response, the pendant was digitally removed from the video on February 26, 2014, after which the petition was closed.

Copyright infringement lawsuit

On July 1, 2014, the St. Louis Post-Dispatch reported that Christian rapper Flame and others filed a lawsuit against Perry, Capitol Records, and Perry's co-writers for infringing copyright on the song "Joyful Noise", which appeared on the 2008 album Our World: Redeemed. The producer, Chike Ojukwu, along with co-songwriter Da' T.R.U.T.H. were listed as co-plaintiffs. Cho'zyn Boy, a DJ for Flame in 2014, stated that Perry's song is "identical" to "Joyful Noise", but ten BPM slower in tempo and one step higher in pitch. In addition to the infringement claims, the suit claimed that "by any measure, the devoutly religious message of 'Joyful Noise' has been irreparably tarnished by its association with the witchcraft, paganism, black magic, and Illuminati imagery evoked by the same music in 'Dark Horse'". Rapper Lecrae, who is featured on the song was and was initially included as a plaintiff in the lawsuit, clarified to MTV that "I was in Hong Kong [when] the press release went out and it's not my song — it's my guy Flame's song and I respect everyone's intellectual properties — but that statement about the witchcraft and stuff, that's not my statement and I don't stand behind that statement." To divest himself from the lawsuit, Lecrae signed over his rights to the song to Flame, Da' T.R.U.T.H., and Ojukwu for free.

In August 2018, Christina A. Snyder from the United States District Court for the Central District of California ruled against a summary judgment, arguing that the plaintiffs "demonstrated a triable issue of fact as to access because 'Joyful Noise' achieved critical success, including a Grammy nomination, and was readily available and viewed millions of times on YouTube and MySpace." She also deferred to the arguments of musicologist Todd Decker, who claimed that the songs share "five or six points of similarity"; specifically, the ostinatos in both songs are either identical or nearly so in their phrase length, rhythm, pitch content, and timbre. Perry and Dr. Luke countered with their own expert testimony from musicologist Lawrence Ferrara that the commonalities between the two songs are merely generic elements. During the federal trial in July 2019, Perry, Dr. Luke, and Max Martin testified that they had never heard "Joyful Noise", and that of the trillions of videos uploaded to YouTube between 2009 and 2013, and their defense team attempted to demonstrate that "Joyful Noise" was not widely accessible to audiences. The lawyer for Flame and the other plaintiffs noted that Perry in the early 2000s started her career in Christian pop, to which Perry replied that even during that part of her career she was "mostly always listening to ... secular music anyway".

Ferrara argued that "Dark Horse" contains elements common to countless songs, including the much older songs "Mary Had a Little Lamb", "Jolly Old St. Nicholas", and "Merrily We Roll Along". Decker claimed that the descending melodies of each ostinato are unique and that he had not "seen another piece that descends in the way these two do." The attorney for Perry and fellow defendants accused Flame and the other plaintiffs of "trying to own basic building blocks of music, the alphabet of music that should be available to everyone." Another argument from Perry and the other defendants was that because Ojukwu never registered the beat he produced and later licensed it to Flame, "Joyful Noise" was itself a derivative work. When Perry testified before the court, initially technical difficulties prevented her lawyers from playing "Dark Horse" in the courtroom, and Perry joked "I could perform it for you live." On July 29, 2019, a federal jury found that Perry, Juicy J, Dr. Luke, Max Martin, Cirkut, and Sarah Hudson were guilty of infringement, along with Capitol Records, Warner Bros. Music Publishing, Kobalt Publishing, and Kasz Money Inc. The jury awarded the plaintiffs $2.78 million, of which Perry herself was ordered to pay $550,000.

Perry and the other defendants moved for judgment as a matter of law. While the motion was under consideration, in early March 2020, the Ninth Circuit (of which the Central District of California is a part of) issued a ruling in a similar long-running lawsuit on whether Led Zeppelin's "Stairway to Heaven" violated the copyright of the song "Taurus" from the band Spirit. In its ruling, the Ninth found that "Stairway" did not violate the copyright of "Taurus", specifically overturning its "inverse ratio rule" which it had used in several previous cases. Perry's lawyers took this ruling as part of their appeal to Judge Snyder. On March 17, 2020, Judge Snyder overturned the jury award, citing numerous factors, including that the evidence given did not support the jury's award, and of the recent Ninth Circuit judgement. Snyder wrote "A relatively common 8-note combination of unprotected elements that happens to be played in a timbre common to a particular genre of music cannot be so original as to warrant copyright protection". Snyder vacated the jury's verdict and denied motions for a new trial, though stated that should the case be heard on appeal at the Ninth Circuit, that a new jury trial would be required. The Ninth Circuit ruled 3–0 in March 2022 to affirm Snyder's decision in Perry's favor, stating that "Allowing a copyright over this material would essentially amount to allowing an improper monopoly over two-note pitch sequences or even the minor scale itself."

Live performances 

"Dark Horse" was first performed at the iHeartRadio Music Festival in Las Vegas on September 20, 2013. It was later performed at the iTunes Festival in London. Perry also performed the song with Juicy J at the We Can Survive event at the Hollywood Bowl on October 23. Perry also performed "Dark Horse" on The Voice of Germany on December 13, 2013. Perry and Juicy J performed the song at the 56th Annual Grammy Awards on January 26, 2014. The "dark and mysterious" performance featured a "haunted forest" design with animatronic horses, broomstick pole dances, and a controlled fire. The singer also performed the song at the 2014 BRIT Awards and the performance featured a neon-colored Egyptian theme, like the music video.

On February 1, 2015, the song was performed by Perry during the Super Bowl XLIX halftime show, where she was on a chessboard, with her dancers as chess pieces. It is regarded as the most technical performance in her halftime set.

Usage in media
The song is used as the theme music for The Face Vietnam season 3.

Credits and personnel
Credits adapted from Prism album liner notes.

Katy Perry – lead vocals, backing vocals, songwriter
Juicy J – featured vocals, backing vocals, songwriter
Sarah Hudson – songwriter
Dr. Luke – producer, songwriter
Max Martin – producer, songwriter
Cirkut – producer, songwriter

Formats and track listings
Digital download – Japan version
"Dark Horse" (featuring TEE) – 3:35

CD single
"Dark Horse" – 3:35
"Dark Horse" (Johnson Somerset Remix) – 9:01

Charts

Weekly charts

Year-end charts

Decade-end charts

All-time charts

Certifications

Release history

See also

List of Billboard Hot 100 number-one singles of 2014
List of Billboard Hot 100 top 10 singles in 2014
List of Dutch Top 40 number-one singles of 2014
List of Billboard Hot 100 number-one singles of the 2010s
List of Canadian Hot 100 number-one singles of 2014
List of Billboard Mainstream Top 40 number-one songs of 2014
List of number-one Billboard Streaming Songs of 2014
List of number-one dance singles of 2014 (U.S.)
List of number-one digital songs of 2014 (U.S.)
List of number-one digital songs of 2014 (Canada)
List of number-one singles of 2014 (Poland)
List of top 10 singles in 2014 (France)
List of UK top-ten singles in 2014

References

Notes

Cites

External links
 
 
 Comparison of "Dark Horse" with Flame's "Joyful Noise"

2013 singles
2013 songs
Juicy J songs
Katy Perry songs
Song recordings produced by Cirkut (record producer)
Song recordings produced by Dr. Luke
Song recordings produced by Max Martin
Songs written by Dr. Luke
Songs written by Juicy J
Songs written by Katy Perry
Songs written by Max Martin
Songs involved in plagiarism controversies
Music video controversies
Religious controversies in music
Number-one singles in Hungary
Number-one singles in Poland
Dutch Top 40 number-one singles
Billboard Hot 100 number-one singles
Canadian Hot 100 number-one singles
MTV Video Music Award for Best Female Video
Songs written by Sarah Hudson (singer)
Islam-related controversies
Songs about witches
Egyptian mythology in music
Capitol Records singles
Ancient Egypt in the American imagination
Self-censorship
Pop-rap songs
Electropop songs